Alexandru Custov (8 May 1954 – 20 March 2008) was a Romanian footballer who played as a midfielder.

Club career
Alexandru Custov was born on 8 May 1954 in Fundeni where he started playing football at junior level in 1968 at local club Gloria Fundeni. In 1969 he went to play for Dinamo București, making his Divizia A debut on 4 May 1972 in a 0–0 against Farul Constanța. In the 1974–75 season, Custov won his first title with the club, contributing with 31 appearances and two goals scored, repeating the performance in the 1976–77 season, this time playing 33 matches and scoring two goals. In his last three seasons spent with The Red Dogs, he won three consecutive Divizia A titles, contributing in the first season with 31 games played and 6 goals scored and in the following two with 28 matches played and 2 goals scored in each season, also winning two Cupa României. Custov played a total of 30 games and scored three goals in European competitions, in the 1981–82 UEFA Cup managing to play 5 games in which he scored one goal on the San Siro stadium in a 1–1 against Inter Milan, thus contributing to its elimination after a 3–2 victory in the second leg and appeared in 6 games in the 1983–84 European Cup as the club reached the semi-finals. In 1984 he went to play for Victoria București in Divizia B, managing to promote after one season in Divizia A, where he would play 7 matches, having a total of 326 matches and 29 goals scored in Divizia A. Custov spent the last years of his career playing for Gloria Buzău and Mecanica Fină București in Divizia B. On 20 March 2008, Custov died at age 53 in his native Fundeni, after suffering from diabetes and thrombophlebitis.

International career
Alexandru Custov played two games at international level for Romania, making his debut on 18 July 1982 when coach Mircea Lucescu sent him on the field in the 58th minute in order to replace Ilie Balaci in a friendly which ended with 3–1 victory against Japan. His second game was 2–0 victory against Sweden at the Euro 1984 qualifiers in which he also came as a substitute, replacing Michael Klein in the 85th minute.

Honours
Dinamo București
Divizia A: 1974–75, 1976–77, 1981–82, 1982–83, 1983–84
Cupa României: 1981–82, 1983–84
Victoria București
Divizia B: 1984–85

Notes

References

External links

1954 births
2008 deaths
Romanian footballers
Liga I players
Liga II players
FC Dinamo București players
Victoria București players
FC Gloria Buzău players
Romania international footballers
Association football midfielders